Ahmad Shamsul Islam (born August 6, 1924) is a Bangladeshi scientist and educator. He was awarded Ekushey Padak in 1987 by the Government of Bangladesh for his contribution to education. He is serving as a Professor of the Department of Botany at the University of Dhaka.

Education and career
Islam earned his bachelor's and bachelor's degrees from Presidency University, Kolkata in 1945 and 1947 respectively. He obtained a Ph.D. from Manchester University, England in 1954. For his postdoctoral research he went on to Cornell University, University of California, Davis, the University of Nottingham and University of Tokyo.

Islam joined BRAC University as a consultant in August 2003.

He served as the moderator of Global Network of Bangladeshi Biotechnologists (GNOBB).  In 2008, he was proposed by Maqsudul Alam to initiate the jute genome sequencing project.

Islam is the founding editor of Sind University Research Journal, Pakistan Journal of Botany, Science Series of Dhaka University, Dar es Salaam University Scientific Research Journal and Bangladesh Journal of Botany.

Awards
 The Currie Memorial Prize (1954)
 Gold Medal by Bangladesh Academy of Sciences (1987)

Personal life
Islam's father, Moulvi Serajul Islam, was a professor at Rajshahi College and Chittagong College. Islam has a son, Yousuf Mahbubul Islam, the current vice-chancellor of Daffodil International University and a daughter, Zeba Islam Seraj, a professor of Biochemistry at the University of Dhaka. Islam resides in Austin, Texas.

References

Further reading
 
 

1924 births
Living people
Presidency University, Kolkata alumni
Alumni of the University of Manchester
Academic staff of the University of Dhaka
Recipients of the Ekushey Padak
Fellows of Bangladesh Academy of Sciences
Pakistani expatriates in the United Kingdom